Todd James Lasance (born 18 February 1985) is an Australian actor, best recognised for his roles in Australian television including Aden Jefferies on Home and Away, Cam Jackson on Rescue: Special Ops, Ben McMahon on Crownies and Major Sydney "Syd" Cook on ANZAC Girls. He has also appeared in American television roles, such as Julius Caesar on Spartacus: War of the Damned, Julian on The Vampire Diaries and Edward Clariss / Rival on The Flash. In 2020, he partnered with his Spartacus co-star Liam McIntyre to create the gaming series Get Good for the CouchSoup YouTube channel, following a charity livestream benefiting Black Summer.

Career
In 2006, Lasance made his acting debut on the teen drama series Blue Water High. In 2007, he was cast in the Seven Network soap opera series Home and Away as Aden Jefferies, which is generally recognized as his breakout role. In October 2007, Seven announced he would become a regular for its 2008 season. In May 2009, he won the Logie Award for Most Popular Actor. In December 2009, Lasance announced he would be leaving the series with a view to pursuing his acting career in America. He filmed his final scenes on December 11, 2009.

In 2008, Lasance made his film debut with a small role in the film Fool's Gold. In 2010, Lasance was cast in one of the planned film spin-offs to the Australian crime drama series Underbelly. The film Underbelly Files: Tell Them Lucifer Was Here concerns the murder of two Victorian police officers and the subsequent hunt for their killers. He portrayed police detective Dean Thomas who was part of the investigation team. The film premiered on February 7, 2011.

In March 2010, the Sydney Morning Herald reported Lasance had signed on to co-star in the drama mini-series Cloudstreet, based on the Tim Winton novel of the same name, in which he played the role of Quick Lamb. The story follows the lives of two working-class Australian families who live together on One Cloud Street and was filmed in Perth. The series premiered on the subscription channel Showcase on 22 May 2011 to positive reviews from critics.

In September 2010, Nine Network announced Lasance had signed on to appear in a recurring role on the third season of the adventure drama series Rescue: Special Ops. He played the role of Cam Jackson, a member of a rival rescue firm which competes with the show's main team.

In January 2011, Lasance was confirmed to be a principal character on the ABC1 legal drama series Crownies in which he played the charismatic young lawyer Ben McMahon. The series reunited Lasance with his former Home and Away cast member Indiana Evans. The series premiered on July 14, 2011 and ran for one season.

After his appearance on Crownies, Lasance was cast in the Nine Network television film The Great Mint Swindle in the role of Peter Mickelberg, one of three Mickelberg brothers suspected of involvement in the Perth Mint Swindle. The film premiered on March 11, 2012 to mixed reviews from critics.

In 2012, Lasance played the role of the young Julius Caesar in the fourth and final season of the American historical action series Spartacus: War of the Damned. The season premiered on January 25, 2013.

Lasance reprised his role of Ben McMahon in the Crownies spin-off Janet King in 2017.

Personal life
Lasance is the son of Robert and Jan Lasance and has an older brother, Chad.  He and his family lived in the town of Medowie, New South Wales before moving to the nearby city of Newcastle in 2002.  He attended St. Philip's Christian College and studied drama as part of his Higher School Certificate before receiving further formal training as an actor at Screenwise in Sydney.  In December 2008, he returned to Screenwise to teach a short acting course for young students.

His acting career required him to relocate to Sydney where he shared a flat with former Home and Away co-star Mark Furze. He has also shared an apartment with Lincoln Lewis, who played his enemy on the show.

In December 2008, he appeared in the music video of the song "Favourite Habit", by Mark Furze's band Falcon Road. He was a candidate for the 2009 Cleo Bachelor of the Year.

Lasance was involved in a car accident on August 10, 2008 in which his Toyota Supra collided with an elderly woman's Honda Civic. He and his passenger escaped with minor injuries, while the elderly driver was taken to hospital in a serious condition but later recovered sufficiently to be released.

Lasance and wife Jordan Wilcox welcomed their first child, a daughter in 2016.

Arrest
On 12 December 2009, Lasance was arrested at a Kings Cross nightclub in Sydney for possession of cocaine. He was subsequently ordered to serve a 12-month good behavior bond. This good behaviour bond has since been lifted.

Filmography

Film

Television

Awards and nominations

References

External links
 Fansite
 Todd's Official MySpace Page
 

1985 births
21st-century Australian male actors
Australian male film actors
Australian male television actors
Living people
Logie Award winners
People from Newcastle, New South Wales